Hans Fróði á Toftanesi (born Hans Fróði Hansen; 25 August 1975) is a retired football player who played 26 games for Faroe Islands. In 2018 he was sentenced to three years and nine months in prison for having instigated woman to commit 41 sexual assaults against her four-year-old son.

Career

Club career
Hans Fróði played in Norway, Iceland and for several Faroese clubs, largely in central defence. He played for Fram Reykjavík in 2004, appearing in twelve games in the 2004 Úrvalsdeild. In November 2004 he joined 1. deild karla club Breiðablik where he appeared in fifteen matches, scoring one goal.

National team career
Hans Fróði was capped 26 times for the Faroe Islands. On 5 June 1999, he scored his only goal for his country. In a qualification match for Euro 2000 in Toftir, he scored a last minute equaliser against Scotland (1-1). He later described this as the finest moment of his footballing career.

He made his international debut in a 0–1 away defeat to Bosnia in Sarajevo on 19 August 1998 and played his last game for the Faroes in a 1–3 home defeat against Lithuania on 10 September 2003 in Toftir.

Manager career
In 2006, he was manager for LÍF Leirvík.

After some of Hans Fróði's ambitious international business projects failed, he decided to resume his career in Faroese football. In 2013, he took over as manager of the top division side TB Tvøroyri. He was TB Tvøroyri's manager until 23 July 2013.

Personal life
Hans Fróði started a second career as fashion and beauty advisor under the name Hans F. Hansen of Scandinavia. His main product line was called Below Your Belt, a series of products intended for pubic hair removal.

Legal history
On 28 May 2018, Hans Fróði was sentenced to three years and nine months imprisonment, when found guilty in having instigated a 43-year-old woman to commit 41 sexual assaults against her four-year-old son.

References

External links
Homepage

1975 births
Living people
Association football defenders
Faroese footballers
Faroe Islands international footballers
Faroese expatriates in Iceland
Association football utility players
Sogndal Fotball players
Expatriate footballers in Norway
Faroese expatriate sportspeople in Norway
Havnar Bóltfelag players
Expatriate footballers in Iceland